The N5 is a national route in South Africa that connects the N1 at Winburg with the N3 at Harrismith, via Senekal, Paul Roux and Bethlehem.

It forms part of the main route between Durban and Bloemfontein as well as the quickest route between Durban and Cape Town, as it connects the N3 towards Durban at Harrismith and the N1 towards Bloemfontein at Winburg.

Route
The N5 begins in Winburg, at an interchange with the N1 north-west of the town centre. It is initially co-signed with the R708 eastwards, bypassing Winburg to the north (where the R709 provides access to the town centre). After 9 kilometres, the R708 becomes its own road south-east towards Marquard, leaving the N5 as the easterly road.

From the R708 split east of Winburg, the N5 heads east for 54 kilometres to the town of Senekal. In Senekal West, the N5 is joined by the R70 from Ventersburg and the R707 from Marquard and they are one road eastwards through the Senekal town centre. After 8 kilometres, east of Senekal, the R707 becomes its own road to the north-east and after another 1 kilometre, the R70 becomes its own road to the south-east.

From the R70 split east of Senekal, the N5 heads eastwards for 60 kilometres, through Paul Roux, to the city of Bethlehem, where it passes through the city centre as two one-way-streets (Muller Street eastwards and Kerk Street westwards). In the Bethlehem City Centre, the N5 meets the R26 and the south-eastern terminus of the R76 at the Commissioner Street junction. The R26 joins the N5 and they are co-signed eastwards through the city centre up to the Hospital Road junction where the R26 becomes the road northwards and the N5 becomes the road southwards. It turns to the south-east and meets the western terminus of the R712 before crossing the As River.

From Bethlehem, the N5 heads eastwards for 37 kilometres to bypass the town of Kestell and meet the R57 at an off-ramp junction north of the town centre. From Kestell, the N5 heads eastwards for 41 kilometres to meet the western terminus of the R74 and enter the city of Harrismith. Just south of the Harrismith City Centre, the N5 crosses the Wilge River and reaches its eastern terminus at an interchange with the N3.

References

External links

 National Roads Agency SA

National Roads in South Africa
Roads in South Africa